The Battle of Happrew was a skirmish which took place around 20 February 1304, during the First War of Scottish Independence. A chevauchée of English knights, which included Robert de Clifford, William de Latimer, and the later Scottish King, Robert the Bruce had been sent south from Dunfermline under Sir John Segrave to locate and capture the rebels Sir William Wallace and Sir Simon Fraser.

Fraser and Wallace escaped.

Location

The action took place in the vicinity of Stobo, near Peebles in the Scottish Borders. Current maps provide locations for Easter Happrew and Wester Happrew. However, the precise location of the skirmish is unknown and the coordinates given are approximate.

External links
William Wallace biography

References

1304 in Scotland
Battles of the Wars of Scottish Independence
Conflicts in 1304